KXMN-LD, VHF digital channel 9, is a low-power television station licensed to Spokane, Washington, United States. It is a translator of ABC affiliate KXLY-TV (channel 4) which is owned by Spokane Television Group, a subsidiary of Morgan Murphy Media. KXMN-LD's transmitter is located on Krell Hill southeast of Spokane; its parent station maintains studios on West Boone Avenue in the city.

History
KXMN-LD first went on the air as an analog repeater of KXLY-TV—first as K09FZ channel 9, then K11VT channel 11, then later as KUUP-LP (reflecting an unrealized UPN affiliation). On May 24, 2006, KUUP-LP became KXMN-LP, after picking up the MyNetworkTV affiliation, soon after the network was first announced. KXMN-LP began separate programming on September 5, 2006. In February 2009, the station signed on a digital signal and once again became a repeater of KXLY.

References

External links

MeTV Spokane–Coeur d'Alene Facebook page

Morgan Murphy Media stations
ABC network affiliates
MeTV affiliates
Heroes & Icons affiliates
Dabl affiliates
XMN-LD
Low-power television stations in the United States
Television channels and stations established in 2006
2006 establishments in Washington (state)